Balai Ringin  is a town and constituency in Serian District, Serian Division, Sarawak, Malaysia, about half an hour drive from Serian town along the Pan Borneo Highway. The area is predominantly inhabited by Iban tribespeople, though there are a few Malay villages. Balai Ringin is now as the part of Greater Kuching Coordinated Development Agency (GKCDA) area, along with Kuching, Samarahan, Serian, and Bau.

Neighbouring settlements include:

Transport

Local Bus or Bus Express remain unclear

References

Serian District
Towns in Sarawak